On March 18, 2000, joggers along a road near the Mount Baker Highway in Whatcom County, Washington, United States, reported seeing a wrecked vehicle at the bottom of an embankment near Canyon Creek, a tributary of the North Fork of the Nooksack River. Investigating deputy sheriffs found a white 1993 Jeep Cherokee with North Carolina license plates. They traced the car to Leah Roberts (born July 23, 1976), who had abruptly left her home in Durham, North Carolina, nine days earlier. A man called police claiming that his wife had seen Roberts in an Everett, Washington, gas station in a disoriented state shortly after the car was found. Her whereabouts remain unknown.

In the years preceding Roberts' disappearance, both of her parents had died and she had survived serious injuries from a car accident. Her friends and siblings have said that this had left her pondering spiritual issues and questioning the direction of her life. She had dropped out of North Carolina State University only months before graduation and had begun spending much of her time in a local coffeehouse, often writing poetry in her journal. A note that Roberts had left behind at her home suggested that she had taken inspiration from the works of Jack Kerouac, particularly his novel The Dharma Bums, which has scenes set at Desolation Peak, near where her car was found. She had also left money for her housemate to cover expenses while she was gone, suggesting she expected to return in the space of a month or so.

Investigators have focused on the possibly contradictory evidence found in Roberts' car. Documents inside suggest she had reached Bellingham, Washington, by March 13, five days before the car was found. Early suspicions that the vehicle was unoccupied when it crashed, which might suggest that it had been wrecked intentionally, were confirmed when the car's starter motor was examined several years later and found to have been tampered with. Blankets hung across the car's windows might suggest it had been used as a shelter after the crash. Roberts' personal belongings were found scattered near the scene, but robbery did not seem likely, as money and jewelry were among them.

Although the case has been featured on the television shows Unsolved Mysteries and Disappeared, few leads have emerged. In the summer of 2005, volunteers from a North Carolina missing-persons awareness group organized a caravan across the country to raise awareness for Leah's case and others; that has since become an annual event.

Background
Leah Toby Roberts was born in 1976, the youngest of three children in a family living in the suburbs of Durham, North Carolina. When she was seventeen, her father was diagnosed with a chronic lung illness. This put a great deal of strain on the family as Roberts began her studies at North Carolina State University in nearby Raleigh in 1995. When she was twenty years old and a sophomore in college, her mother died suddenly from heart disease.

In the fall of 1998, she returned to school after taking some time off, but was involved in a serious car accident that resulted in a punctured lung and a shattered femur. Surgeons inserted a metal rod next to her femur to help it heal. Roberts told her sister Kara later that, when she saw the truck that she hit pull out in front of her, she was certain she would die and felt "born again" after her recovery. She took some time off from college and decided she wanted to live her life to the fullest.

In the spring of 1999, just three weeks before she was scheduled to leave for Costa Rica for a field program, Roberts' father died. However, she decided to continue with the program. Since she was leaving the country and no longer had living parents, Leah granted Kara power of attorney over her bank accounts, where some money that she had inherited from her parents had been deposited.

With her degree in Spanish and anthropology almost complete, Roberts dropped out of school. Kara and her brother Heath tried to persuade her to "stick it out" for six more months, but she refused. Instead, she learned to play the guitar, took up photography as a hobby and adopted a pet kitten that she named Bea. Leah began hanging out in local coffeehouses, writing poetry about the meaning of life throughout her journals and making new friends in the process. With one of them, Jeannine Quiller, and with her roommate, Nicole Bennett, she discussed the idea of emulating Beat Generation novelist Jack Kerouac and going on a road trip to the West.

Disappearance
On the morning of March 9, 2000, Leah talked on the phone with Kara about possible future plans. They made no commitments, but Kara recalls the conversation ending with the understanding that the two would be seeing each other in some fashion in the near future. Later, in the early afternoon, Leah and Nicole agreed to do some babysitting together the next day. The roommate went out to her job and returned later, at which point she noticed that Leah's 1993 white Jeep Cherokee was not there, nor Leah herself. She thought nothing of it as Leah had been coming and going for unpredictable intervals since she had dropped out of school and, living off her inheritance for the time being, had no need to report to a job.

However, Leah was not at the babysitting appointment the next day, and had not returned home by its end. By the end of the following day, March 11, not only was Leah still absent, but friends and family who had expected to see her had been calling the house trying to find her. On Monday, March 13, Kara reported her missing to Durham police.

Investigation
On March 14, Kara, along with Leah's roommate Nicole, searched Leah's room. A significant amount of Leah's clothes were missing, suggesting a planned lengthy absence. She seemed to have taken Bea with her as well, and she had left a note: "I'm not suicidal. I'm the opposite," she reassured her sister and friends, and mentioned Kerouac. Along with the note, she had bundled some cash, approximately a month's worth of her share of the rent and expenses, and suggested she would be returning eventually. The note was illustrated with a drawing of the Cheshire Cat's grin.

Since Kara still had power of attorney over Leah's bank accounts, she was able to look at her sister's financial records. She discovered that Leah had withdrawn several thousand dollars on the afternoon of March 9, and then used her debit card to pay for a motel room near Memphis, Tennessee. Later transactions were purchases of gas or food, their locations suggesting Leah was traveling west along Interstate 40, and then north on Interstate 5 when she reached I-40's western end in California.

After a gas purchase shortly after midnight on the morning of March 13 in Brooks, Oregon, all activity on Leah's accounts ended. To understand why her sister was heading to the Pacific Northwest, Kara and Susie Smith, Leah's best friend, went to the coffee shops in Durham that Leah had been frequenting. There they found Jeannine Quiller, with whom Leah had discussed Kerouac's work. The two had been particularly struck by Kerouac's 1958 novel The Dharma Bums, a sequel to the better-known On the Road, in which he had for a time worked as a U.S. Forest Service fire lookout on Desolation Peak in the northern Cascade Mountains of Washington, where he was profoundly affected by the beauty of the landscape. Leah had expressed interest in seeing that area for herself.

Kara was relieved to have discovered her sister's probable objective. Leah's accounts showed no new activity, but Kara had no reason to believe that something unfortunate had occurred.

Discovery of vehicle
Kara expected that Leah would call her on March 18 to wish her a happy 26th birthday. Instead, on that day, she received a note from the Durham County sheriff's office telling her to call one of their counterparts in the Whatcom County sheriff's office in Bellingham, Washington. She then learned that, earlier that day, Leah's Jeep had been discovered in a remote forest, but Leah herself was not present.

Early that morning in Washington, a couple jogging along Canyon Creek Road, a side route of the Mount Baker Highway that serves some isolated residences and logging camps in and around Mount Baker-Snoqualmie National Forest, a short distance south of the Canada–US border, had noticed articles of clothing at the side of the road next to a slight curve at the top of a slope. Some had been tied to the trees and branches at roadside. In the woods below, at the bottom of a steep embankment, was Leah's Jeep, severely damaged.

From the path that the car had taken through the trees and the extent to which the car and trees had been damaged, investigators from the Washington State Patrol determined that the Jeep had been traveling at nearly  when it went off the road and down the slope. The contents of the vehicle were tossed around inside, consistent with a multiple rollover, yet there was no blood or other signs of injury to an occupant, such as shatter marks on the glass or stretching of the seatbelt, that would have probably occurred if there had been a driver and/or passenger. It seemed possible that no one had been inside the Jeep when it crashed, suggesting that the accident might have been staged or planned.

However, blankets and pillows were hung inside the windows, suggesting that it had been used as a shelter after being wrecked. Leah's passport, checkbook, driver's license, clothes, guitar, CDs and other belongings were found scattered in the surrounding woods. Bits of cat food and a small cat carrier were found in the vehicle, confirming that Leah had taken Bea on the trip with her, although the cat has never been found. However, valuables, such as $2,500 in cash in a pants pocket and jewelry, were also left behind, suggesting that robbery had not been the reason for the accident.

Kara and Heath flew to Bellingham to assist investigators. They visited the crash site, and, with the assistance of the sheriff's office, created a flyer that they posted around town. They went into businesses that Leah may have visited and queried owners and customers. Among Leah's belongings, they found a box of mementos from the trip that provided a clue that established more clearly when Leah had arrived in Whatcom County: a ticket stub from a March 13 afternoon showing of American Beauty at the theaters in Bellingham's Bellis Fair shopping mall. This suggested that Leah might have spent a few hours in the city after having arrived at the beginning of the day following the five-to-six-hour drive from where she had bought gas in Oregon.

Near the theater was the mall's only sit-down restaurant, where Heath and Kara believed that Leah might have gone for a meal. Police were led to two customers, both men, who not only recalled Leah but had sat on each side of her at the restaurant's counter that day, talking about Kerouac and her plans. One of the men claimed that she had left with a third, whom he heard her call Barry, and provided a description for a police sketch of the man. However, neither the other man nor any other customer who had been in the restaurant at the time could corroborate the third man's existence.

At a police garage to which it had been towed, investigators continued to examine the Jeep, joined by the FBI, who had become involved because Leah had crossed state lines. Two aspects of the evidence that they developed suggested to them that Leah had been the victim of a crime. First, the amount of money found in her pants suggested that she had spent very little in Bellingham, less than could be expected if she had been in the city for several days. Second, under a floor mat they found Leah's mother's engagement ring, which Leah wore constantly. Her friends in North Carolina said that she treasured it for the connection it offered to her late mother and that she would never have taken it off voluntarily unless she had completely forgotten who she was.

Heath and Kara returned to North Carolina after four days. Working on the theory that Leah might have been injured in the accident and wandered off, police spent two weeks in April searching, with help from dogs and helicopters, the area that Leah may have possibly covered if she had left the scene of the crash. They found no trace of her. Security camera footage from the gas station at which Leah had stopped at in Oregon showed her alone and apparently in good condition, although several times she peered out into the parking lot (an area not covered by the cameras) while waiting for her transaction to be completed. This could suggest a traveling companion, perhaps the "Barry" with whom her dining companion at Bellis Fair had claimed she had left, but had a man indeed been with her, investigators believe that he did not travel in her car.

Subsequent developments
A few days after the Jeep was discovered, a man called the sheriff's office to report a sighting of Leah. He claimed that his wife had seen Leah, disoriented and confused, wandering around a gas station in Everett, closer to Seattle. After disclosing this information, he seemed to panic and hung up before identifying himself. Police nevertheless consider the tip credible; it might have been the last sighting of Leah.

In 2001, the Lifetime television series Unsolved Mysteries ran a segment on the case that generated some new tips for investigators and reports that Leah had been sighted elsewhere in the U.S., but nothing that proved credible.

Back in North Carolina, Kara contacted Monica Caison, a Wilmington woman who had helped other families find missing loved ones after cases had gone officially cold. Caison, with the help of a network of volunteers called Community United Effort, has specialized in keeping cases alive in the media for which official efforts have exhausted all leads. In 2005, on the fourth anniversary of Leah's disappearance, Caison organized a caravan across the country, following Leah's route west to Bellingham, to raise awareness about Leah's unsolved case and those of other missing persons; this has since become an annual event. She and Kara appeared on CNN's Larry King Live in 2005. "I really don't know how I would have made it through the past five years without her," Kara told the host. "We're just trying to, you know, keep Leah's face out there as much as possible."

After the initial investigation concluded, Kara asked the Whatcom County sheriff's office to keep Leah's car in case more clues turned up years later. This decision bore fruit in 2006 when Mark Joseph, the detective who had originally investigated the case, passed his files on to two younger detectives. Reviewing the case, one of the detectives noticed that the car and its contents had not been fully processed for evidence when it was originally brought in, so the two decided to finish that job.

As no one had looked under the Jeep's hood during the initial investigation, the detectives pried it open and found that a wire had been cut, allowing the car to accelerate without anyone having depressed the gas pedal, confirming early suspicions that no one had been in the car when it left the road, and thus had been purposely wrecked. The detectives found a fingerprint under the hood and some male DNA on an article of Leah's clothing.

This led them back to the man who had claimed Leah left the Bellis Fair restaurant with the third man she called "Barry", whom only that second man had reported seeing. That man had worked as a mechanic and had a military background, further raising the detectives' suspicions. He had also moved to Canada in the interim, complicating and lengthening an effort to get fingerprints and DNA from him. By the time that Investigation Discovery aired an episode on the case in 2011, the fingerprint had turned out to not be a match, but detectives were still waiting on the DNA sample. Investigators continue to hope that the additional evidence that they collected will lead to a resolution of the case, although repeated searches of the area, with dogs trained to sniff for corpses and with metal detectors that could find the metal rod in Leah's leg, have failed to discover anything new.

See also

List of North Carolina State University people
List of people who disappeared

References

External links
Whatcom County Sheriff's Office page on Leah Roberts case 

2000s missing person cases
Missing person cases in Washington (state)
2000 in Washington (state)
2000 in North Carolina
History of Durham, North Carolina
History of Whatcom County, Washington
Possibly living people
March 2000 events in the United States
History of women in Washington (state)
Women in North Carolina